Miklós Urbanovics (born 28 February 1942) is a Hungarian wrestler. He competed in the men's freestyle 74 kg at the 1972 Summer Olympics.

References

1942 births
Living people
Hungarian male sport wrestlers
Olympic wrestlers of Hungary
Wrestlers at the 1972 Summer Olympics
Sportspeople from Debrecen